Idnibba was a Palestinian village, located at latitude 31.7426937N and longitude 34.8561001,E in the southern part of the Ramle Subdistrict. It was depopulated in 1948, at which time its population was 568, and its lands are now used by Kfar Menahem.

History
Idnibba may have been built on the site of the Roman settlement of Danuba. The Crusaders also called it Danuba.

Ottoman era
In 1517, the village  was incorporated into the Ottoman Empire with the rest of Palestine, and in 1596 it appeared under the name of Dinba in the  tax registers being in the  nahiya (subdistrict) of Gaza under the liwa' (district) of Gaza. It had 36 households, an estimated population of 198; all Muslim.  They paid taxes on a number of crops, including wheat, barley and sesame seeds, as well as goats and beehives; a total of 10,800 akçe.

In 1838, Edward Robinson  noted Idhnibbeh as a Muslim village  located in the Gaza district.  

In 1863 Victor Guérin found the village to be situated on a low hill, and with a population of 600. He also noted a  well which was built with ancient blocks, and olives gardens surrounding the village.  An Ottoman  village list from about 1870 found that the village (calling it ed-denube) had  a population of 265, in a total of  74  houses, though the population count included men, only. 

In 1882 the PEF's Survey of Western Palestine (SWP) described  Idnibba as a village built of stone and adobe and situated on high ground. It was surrounded by cactus hedges and had a fig tree orchard to the south.

British Mandate era
In the 1922 census of Palestine, conducted by the British Mandate authorities, Idnebbeh had a population of 275 Muslims,  increasing in the 1931 census to 345, still all Muslims, in a total of 87 houses.

Most villagers worked in agriculture and animal husbandry. In the 1945 statistics the population was 490, all Muslims,  while the total land area was 8,103 dunams, according to an official land and population survey.  Of this, a total of 5,277 dunums of village land was used for cereals, 85 dunums were irrigated or used for orchards, of which 64 dunums was for olives.  while 25 dunams were classified as built-up public areas.

1948 and aftermath
On 16 July 1948, during Operation An-Far, Givati HQ informed General Staff\Operations that "our forces have entered the villages of Qazaza, Kheima, Jilya, Idnibba, Mughallis, expelled the inhabitants, [and] blown up and torched a number of houses. The area is at the moment clear of Arabs."

There are no Israeli settlements on village lands. The settlement of Kefar Menachem, built in 1937, is about 2 km southwest of the village site.

Palestinian historian Walid Khalidi described the remains of Idnibba in 1992: "The site and the surrounding lands have been converted into pastures and woods. A large area has been leveled by bulldozers. Demolished walls and the remnants of stone houses lie at various points on the site. There are natural caves with artificial, arched entrances on the upper, western edge of the site."

See also
Depopulated Palestinian locations in Israel

References

Bibliography

External links
Welcome to Idnibba
Idnibba, Zochrot
Survey of Western Palestine, Map 16:   IAA, Wikimedia commons

Arab villages depopulated during the 1948 Arab–Israeli War
District of Ramla